The Top Christian Albums chart is a record chart compiled by Billboard magazine, ranking the week's best-performing Christian albums in the United States. Like the Billboard 200, the data is compiled by Nielsen Soundscan based on each album's weekly physical and digital sales, as well as on-demand streaming and digital sales of its individual tracks.

Number ones

References

External links
 Top Christian Albums – 2020 Archive
 Current week

Christian Albums 2020s
United States Christian Albums
Contemporary Christian Albums